Krasimir Gaydarski or Krasimir Gajdarski (born 23 February 1983) is a Bulgarian male volleyball player. He was part of the Bulgaria men's national volleyball team. He competed with the national team at the 2008 Summer Olympics in Beijing, China. He played with Olympiacos in 2008.

Clubs
 2003-2007  Levski Sofia
 2007-2009  Olympiacos S.C.
 2009-2010  SCC Berlin
 2010  Neftyanik Orenburg
 2011-2012  Kalleh Mazandaran
 2012-2013  Levski Volley

See also
 Bulgaria at the 2008 Summer Olympics

References

1983 births
Living people
Bulgarian men's volleyball players
Olympiacos S.C. players
Place of birth missing (living people)
Volleyball players at the 2008 Summer Olympics
Olympic volleyball players of Bulgaria